Antiguraleus costatus is a species of sea snail, a marine gastropod mollusk in the family Mangeliidae.

Taxonomy
The World Register of Marine Species still accepts the name Guraleus wilesianus Hedley, 1922  as the accepted name, relying on the original description by Hedley as Guraleus costatus var. wilesianus Hedley, 1922  However, Sealifebase accepts the name Antiguraleus wilesianus (Hedley, 1922). To complicate the matter, the Australian Museum records this species as Antiguraleus costatus (Hedley, 1922) with the syntype Guraleus costatus wilesianus Hedley, 1922 and accepts it as Antiguraleus costatus wilesianus (Hedley, 1922)  As of 2017 there has been no authoritative revision of this group.

Description
The length of the shell attains 10 mm, its diameter 3 mm.

(Original description) The small, thin shell has an elongate-ovate shape. Its colour is pale cream, with one or two faint and narrow buff zones. Itcontains six whorls, of which two form the protoconch. The  upper whorls are glossy. The sculpture shows narrow, sharp radials, elevated riblets, becoming closer and smaller as growth proceeds, and vanishing on the base. The first adult whorl has sixteen riblets, which increase to about twenty-seven on the body whorl. The base of the shell has about ten incised spiral lines. The aperture is wide. The outer lip is thin, not inflected, with a wide and shallow sinus.

Distribution
This marine species is endemic to Australia and occurs off New South Wales.

References

 Laseron, C. 1954. Revision of the New South Wales Turridae (Mollusca). Australian Zoological Handbook. Sydney : Royal Zoological Society of New South Wales 1-56, pls 1-12.

External links
  Tucker, J.K. 2004 Catalog of recent and fossil turrids (Mollusca: Gastropoda). Zootaxa 682:1-1295.

costatus
Gastropods described in 1922
Gastropods of Australia